Yemi Amodu (born August 8, 1968) is a Nigerian actor, writer, dramatist, director, and producer. He has won several awards including NFVCB Director of Best Film of the Month in 2003, Best Director FNEI in 2006, Director/Producer, Best Indigenous Film, Abuja Film Festival 2008, and Director, Best Epic Film of the year, YOMAFA in 2011.

Early life 
Amodu was born in Ibadan Oyo State Nigeria.  He received his primary education at Salvation Army and Methodist School and later attended Mafoluku Grammar School, Lagos for his secondary education.

He started as an actor, a poet and a talking drummer in 1983 while still in secondary school. Amodu holds a Diploma and Bachelor of Arts Degree in Directing from Department of Performing Arts, Olabisi Onabanjo University.

He worked for his alma mater as Academic Technologist teaching Film Production and its technicalities and is the director of research and documentation for the Theatre Arts and Motion Picture Practitioners’ Association of Nigeria.

Career 
Amodu joined Ace studio that later become DBN TV as a trainee editor in 1989, and later became proficient in craft of editing on U-Matic and Betacam SP. But to operate in broadcasting them, one must be protean in production, which was why he had to learn the craft of Cinematography and Sound with avidity. It was this mastery that earned him a quick rise in the industry.

And with an inquisitive mind, he proceeded to the field and worked as a Continuity Manager, a Sound Recordist, Production Manager and assistant director before he eventually produced his first movie “Evil Rise” which was shot on U-Matic in 1992.

His indubitable mastery of Screen and Apparatus theory makes him a man of many paths in screen productions. He has shot many successful musical videos for top Nigerian musicians like Adewale Ayuba, Wale Thompson, and Lanre Teriba aka Atorise to mention a few. In addition to this, he has many awards to his name not only in feature and non-feature films but also in music videos.

In April 2014, he indicated his desire to contest for the president of The Movie Ambassadors, TMA. He later stepped down for the eventual winner of the election, Saheed Balogun.

In 2017, Amodu's new work Shadows was approved by The Bank of Industry (BOI) Nigeria, to benefit from its multimillion Nollyfund project. The movie is directed by Ben Akugbe and scripted by Ade Adeniyi.

Filmography 

 Folashade 
 Okiki 
 Campus Girl 
 Ndakobas(All Dwarf film)
 Obinrin Ale 
 Matuwo
 Asoko Peye 
 Oju Kan Epa
 Asoko peye 2 
 Obiri Oloja
 Alábàtà 
 Owo Eje
 Sonibarin 
 Ogun Abele
 Eto ikoko 
 Abente
 Òwú ìyá 2 
 Edungbalanja
 Erin lakatabu (cassified by BBFC) 
 Ojo Oganjo
 Lánléyìn 
 Òwú ìyá 
 Erù elérù 
 Ògédé Didùn 
 Afonja 
 Ladepo Omo Adanwo
 Shadow Parties

Awards 

 NFVCB Director of Best Film of the Month 2003
 Best Director FNEI 2006
 Director/Producer, Best Indigenous Film, Abuja Film Festival 2008
 Director, Best Epic Film of the year, YOMAFA 2011
 VCOAN Meritorious Award of Excellence 2012, Best Director of the Year, Afro Hollywood 2013

References

External links 
 

Living people
1968 births
21st-century Nigerian male actors
Nigerian male television actors
Yoruba actors